Zeng Sini (born 3 January 1988) is a Chinese cyclist.

Career
She won a gold medal in the Women's individual pursuit C1-2-3 event at the 2012 Summer Paralympics.

References

Living people
1988 births
Paralympic gold medalists for China
Paralympic cyclists of China
Chinese female cyclists
Cyclists from Guangdong
People from Yunfu
UCI Para-cycling World Champions
Medalists at the 2012 Summer Paralympics
Paralympic medalists in cycling
Cyclists at the 2012 Summer Paralympics
Cyclists at the 2020 Summer Paralympics
21st-century Chinese women